The following is a list of characters in The Aquabats! Super Show!, an American action-comedy television series which aired on the United States cable channel The Hub for two seasons from March 3, 2012 to January 18, 2014.

A mix of live-action and animation, The Aquabats! Super Show! follows the adventures of The Aquabats, a band of superhero rock musicians as they defend the world against a variety of villains and monsters. The series is predominantly based upon The Aquabats' own background as a real-life band, and as such has adapted numerous characters from the band's stage shows and elaborate fictional mythology.

Main characters

The Aquabats
The Aquabats are a band of superhero rock musicians who travel the countryside fighting the forces of evil while moonlighting as a struggling rock and roll band. Despite their variety of superpowers, abilities and technology, the group are generally bumbling and inexperienced, and more often than not save the day by sheer luck or crudely unorthodox methods. In the series' first season, The Aquabats are depicted as an obscure and mostly out-of-work local superhero team, overshadowed by other, more competent superheroes and usually only stumbling into trouble they're directly or indirectly the cause of. After saving the world in the season finale, however, the band are recognized and treated as international heroes and celebrities in the second season, receiving top-priority government assignments and even sponsoring their own summer camp.

The Aquabats live and travel by way of the BattleTram, a modified recreational vehicle which serves as a combination tour bus and mobile command center. Unlike most other superheroes, The Aquabats have no alter egos to speak of, and are never seen without their trademark masks and helmets. The band's origin story was kept intentionally vague by the series' writers; while the first season made no references or allusions to the group's history, several episodes of the second season feature each member of The Aquabats recounting how they came together via animated flashback sequences. However, as each of these flashbacks directly contradict one another, it remains unknown if any could be considered officially canonical.

The five members of The Aquabats are:

 The MC Bat Commander (played by Christian Jacobs) – The Aquabats' lead singer and "fearless leader". The Commander possesses great stamina and a swaggering bravado, but unlike his bandmates, doesn't have any actual superpowers. He is depicted as naive and impulsive to a fault, such as being unable to turn down any kind of bet no matter how the odds are stacked against him, but his sharp and decisive leadership skills have led the band to victory on several occasions.
 Crash McLarson (played by Chad Larson) – The band's burly bass guitarist.  Despite being the brawniest of The Aquabats, Crash is often the most cowardly member of the team, though also the most well-meaning and good-natured. Crash has the ability to grow up to 100 feet in size but has yet to learn how to fully control his powers, growing mostly when he experiences overwhelmingly negative emotions. As one of the few characters with a catchphrase, Crash often exclaims "GETTING EMOTIONAL!" right before he starts to grow.
 Jimmy the Robot (played by James R. Briggs, Jr.) – The Aquabats' keyboardist. An android, Jimmy has a variety of powers and abilities, including a vast array of built-in weaponry. With his superhuman knowledge database, he also serves as The Aquabats' resident scientist, aiding the band in matters of science and technology. As per his mechanical nature, Jimmy has an emotionless robotic personality and is regularly confused by human emotions and behavior, a constant source of teasing from his bandmates. Jimmy's personality was the only notable change from the series' pilot, wherein he had a more sarcastic human attitude.
While all of the other Aquabats' flashbacks regarding their origins contradict each other, Jimmy is the only member to have a confirmed history prior to joining the band, having been built by eccentric farmer Ralph Goodman (Mark Mothersbaugh) as a helper droid on an apple farm before leaving on his own to follow his dreams of becoming a crime-fighting musician.

 Ricky Fitness (played by Richard Falomir) – The Aquabats' drummer, who possesses the power of super speed. True to his name, Ricky is the most health-conscious of the group, eschewing the other members' fondness for junk food and lethargy to maintain a regular focus on keeping fit and trim. Ricky is portrayed as somewhat of a ladies man; a running gag throughout the series finds him flirting or being flirted with by various female characters, even in the middle of fight scenes or other tense situations.
 EagleBones Falconhawk (played by Ian Fowles) – The Aquabats' guitarist, the "sonic shredder". A skilled guitarist, EagleBones is equipped with a weaponized electric guitar which blasts energy beams out of its headstock. Following an encounter in the desert with the "Spirit of the Sun", EagleBones was bestowed with a spirit guide, an invisible female eagle named The Dude whom he summons to aide him in battle, as well as the gift of second sight. While EagleBones was originally depicted as the cocky and often conceited maverick of the band, he has since displayed a more altruistic demeanor, finding it hard to refuse any civilian's request for help.

Supplemental characters

Villains

Live-action
 ManAnt (voiced by Mr. Lawrence, performed by Art Mitchell) – An ant-headed humanoid in a three-piece pinstriped suit who was inadvertently created by a young Crash McLarson following a genie wish gone awry. Accidentally abandoned by young Crash just moments after his creation, ManAnt bitterly turned to evil, spending years recruiting a team of henchmen to assist him in his plans for world domination. After capturing Crash in the episode "ManAnt!", ManAnt siphons Crash's growth powers to assume human size, further using it to give rise to an army of giant ants to carry out his bidding
 EagleClaw Falconhawk (played by Jon Heder) – EagleBones' estranged older brother who inexplicably has eagle talons for hands. He bears a lifelong jealous grudge against his brother, both for always being the center of attention in the Falconhawk family and for unknowingly stealing his childhood sweetheart when they were kids (even though EagleBones claims he never liked her). Like EagleBones, EagleClaw exhibits exceptionally proficient skills on laser-powered electric guitar, and appears in the episode "EagleClaw!" to challenge his brother to a showdown.
 Eva Mudlark (played by Katharine Towne) – A descendant of a long line of lowly garbage collectors, Eva Mudlark is a manic German-accented mad scientist who uses her scientific prowess to animate piles of garbage into monster minions in an attempt to redeem her family name. When The Aquabats destroy one of her creations, Eva plots for revenge by creating a sentient creature out of dryer lint and the Aquabats' dirty clothes. She was eventually crushed by the remains of the new monster. She is the primary villain of the episode "Laundry Day!"
 Quera, Hera & Vera (all played by Janet Paraiso) – A three-headed siren whose enchanting singing hypnotizes men to carry out their devious bidding. All three of her heads extend from long necks, though two are usually hidden underneath a thick parka to remain inconspicuous. While Hera and Vera are cruel and manipulative, Quera is quiet and sensitive. Ricky Fitness falls smitten with Quera during a party on the Battletram, and after the three are banished to the Underworld by a gang of biker mummies, he begins a long-distance relationship with her. Quera, Hera & Vera appear in the episode "Ladyfingers!".
 Cowboy Android Sheriff (played and voiced by Paul Scheer, faceless body performed by Matt Gorney) – A robot gunslinger modeled after a popular movie titled Cowboy Androids, the Cowboy Android Sheriff was designed to be a feature of a hyper-realistic Western-themed amusement park until his circuitry malfunctioned, turning him from a docile servant droid into a sadistic lawman who holds the park's tourists captive under his brutal enforcement. The character and plot are heavily based upon the 1973 science fiction film Westworld. He is the primary antagonist of the episode "Cowboy Android Sheriff!".
 Überchaun (played by Dana Michael Woods) – A sinister blue-skinned leprechaun who lives on a golf course, the Überchaun impulsively places curses upon people who he perceives to have wronged him. As per his mischievous nature, he presents each cursed person with a series of three challenges to complete to break the spell( tie a ribbon to the top of an ancient tree, pull the flag out of the 13th hole of the golf course, and to fetch him a cherry soda from the clubhouse's vending machine), though devises a series of tricks in an attempt to prevent them from succeeding. He is featured in the episode "Überchaun!".
 The Floating Eye of Death – A creature from an in-series ancient myth, the Floating Eye of Death is exactly what its name would imply, a gigantic floating eyeball who ensnares innocent people in its tentacled grasp and sucks out their souls with its deadly glare, transforming them into zombie slaves as part of a plan to devour the souls of every human on Earth. The antagonist of the episode of the same name, the Floating Eye of Death is a character derived from The Aquabats' music and band mythology, being the center of the song "Giant Robot-Birdhead!" from the 1999 album The Aquabats vs. the Floating Eye of Death!.

 CobraMan (voiced by Brad Davis) – Another character adapted from The Aquabats' stage shows, CobraMan is a malevolent half-man/half-cobra hybrid wearing sensible slacks. As part of his mutation, CobraMan has two large cobras for hands, both of which shoot smaller snakes out of their mouths and can extend to great lengths. CobraMan works at a roadside sideshow under the employ of Carl (played by Matt Chapman), a shady wrestling mask-wearing carnival barker who attempts to steal The Aquabats' Battletram and take CobraMan out on tour. Carl is directly modeled in voice and appearance after the character Strong Bad from Homestar Runner, a popular web cartoon created by Chapman. Both characters appear in the episode "CobraMan!".
 Space Monster "M" (played by Dallas McLaughlin) – A gigantic disembodied head from the far reaches of outer space, Space Monster "M" descends upon the Earth with the intent of annihilating the planet. He inconspicuously appears in the background of several episodes of the first season disguised as a small girl (inexplicably dressed as Vicki from Small Wonder), though doesn't reveal his true form until the episode "Showtime!" after he gains supernatural strength and power from SuperMagic PowerMan!'s magic headband and proceeds to control an enormous destructive robot body.

Space Monster "M" is one of the oldest characters in the Aquabats mythology, having been named in their 1997 song "Theme Song!" as the malicious invader of The Aquabats' home island of Aquabania. Although this backstory is touched upon in flashback in the season two episode "Summer Camp!", it is unknown if this can be considered canonical as all of the origin flashbacks in season two contradict one another.

 Ronmark (played and voiced by Paul Rust) – First appearing in human form in the episode "Night of the Cactus!", Ronmark is an arrogant and egotistical man who hires The Aquabats to perform a romantic song for his girlfriend Zalga (played by Kate Freund), only to stiff them on the payment. After being sprayed with a liquid mutagen from an alien meteorite at the end of the episode, he later returns in the season two premiere "The Return of The Aquabats!" as a hideously mutated Cthulhu-esque creature (played by Mark Fordham) who attempts to destroy The Aquabats.
 Camp Counselor Jewel (played and voiced by Leslie Hall) – The main villain of the episode "Summer Camp!", Jewel is the extremely perky and outgoing counselor at Camp Radventures, a summer camp where children learn to become AquaCadets under the training of The Aquabats. Despite her caring and motivational demeanor, Jewel also happens to be a shapeshifting werebeast known as a Were-Ape (played by Mark Fordham), who kidnaps children and forces them to mine for jewels as decorations for her gem sweaters. It is revealed that she's in a committed relationship with Bigfoot.
 Silver Skull (played by Mark Fordham) – A mysterious cloaked figure in a silver skull mask who speaks in a "very purposefully bad Bane impression", Silver Skull is one of the main antagonists of the episode "The AntiBats!", who, for reasons unspecified, seeks to destroy The Aquabats to steal a brain transplant the band is transporting for a state governor. While the extent of Silver Skull's powers is as of yet unknown, it is shown that his silver skull-capped walking cane has the ability to shoot laser beams, with which The AntiBats were granted with their superpowers. Silver Skull is yet another villain adapted from The Aquabats' stage shows and mythology, having previously appeared in the band's 1999 pilot The Aquabats in Color!, albeit in a remarkably different costume consisting of an afro and skintight unitard.
 The AntiBats – The AntiBats consist of members of "local thrash heroes" Asthma (played by Mikey Way, Kyla Broderick, Brad Davis and Derrick deVilliers) and "dubstep whiz kid" Skillsawz (played by Matthew Gorney, in a parody of Skrillex), two popular musical acts who unjustly lost a Battle of the Bands contest The Aquabats were judging. Vowing revenge, they strike a deal with the nefarious Silver Skull, who bestows them with otherworldly powers and a matching wardrobe to help them seek their vengeance against The Aquabats.
 Krampus (voiced by Robert Smigel) – Originated in ancient Alpine folklore, the Krampus was a beast-like creature who punished naughty children during the Christmas season, working in contrast with Saint Nicholas, who rewarded good children with gifts. In Super Show!, Krampus, frustrated by the political correctness of the holiday season in that even naughty children receive presents, invades the small village of East Krampton where he outlaws all mention and celebration of Christmas under penalty of severe lashings with the enforcement of his vaguely Nazi-esque soldiers. He appears in the episode "Christmas with The Aquabats!".
 Kitty Litter (played by Mark Fordham, voiced by Ben Garant) – A human-sized cat man who used to live in the city dump, Kitty Litter once attempted to expand his garbage empire by littering the city with trash until he was thwarted by The Aquabats, gaining the power of teleportation following a mishap with a time vortex. In the episode "Kitty Litter!", he abducts the city's cutest kittens as part of scheme to power a gigantic robot and strew the world with garbage. Kitty Litter was formerly a villain in The Aquabats' stage shows, played by a person in a fursuit who would come out and throw litter at the audience, usually to segue into the band's cover of The Kids of Widney Highs "Throw Away the Trash".

Animated
 Moon Cheese (voiced by Evan Sinclair) – The primary antagonist in the first three cartoons of season one, Moon Cheese is a telekinetic alien who resides in the center of the Moon with his henchmen, the Moon Shadow Soldiers. He kidnaps the MC Bat Commander in a plot to sap his brain energy to power a laser to destroy the Earth, but his plan is quickly thwarted by The Aquabats. Moon Cheese's fate is never revealed in the first season, and it is unknown if he escaped prior to the Moon's implosion in the episode "Überchaun!".
 The Underwater King (voiced by Christian Jacobs) – The lazy King who rules over the underwater city beneath the surface of the Moon. In the cartoon in the episode "Laundry Day!", Jimmy the Robot is imprisoned in his underwater dungeon, where the King plans to melt him down into a refreshing beverage. Two episodes later, in "Haunted Battletram!", he makes his appearance, He tells Jimmy he will be his servant until The Aquabats flood the underwater city by breaking a hole in its dome, but he just says, "Uh, I'm okay, I'm-a taking a nap." and isn't seen throughout the rest of the show.
 The Time Sprinkler (voiced by James R. Briggs, Jr.) – The Time Sprinkler appears in the final cartoon of the first season, throwing The Aquabats into a time loop in which they would perpetually repeat the last year of their life, sending them back to the season's first episode (and thus eternal reruns). The Time Sprinkler is another character adapted from The Aquabats' stage shows, and was the subject of the song "Tiger Rider vs. The Time Sprinkler" on their 2005 album Charge!!.

Allies

Live-action
 Pilgrim Boy (played by Samm Levine) – A reluctant superhero who dresses and speaks like that of a 17th-century Pilgrim settler, Pilgrim Boy possesses the power to shapeshift into any possible object. Although the act of doing so causes him great physical pain, his Puritanical level of politeness forces him to transform at any given request. He assists The Aquabats in destroying a giant potato bug in the episode "Pilgrim Boy!".
 President Stuncastin (played by "Weird Al" Yankovic) – The incumbent President within The Aquabats' universe, he appears in the episode "Pilgrim Boy!" hosting a press conference addressing the rampaging potato bug destroying Detroit's pineapple plantations. The character's name refers to the process of stunt casting, in which notable celebrities appear in a film or television series in an attempt to boost ratings and publicity.
 Chainsaw and Catboy (respectively played by Corey Pollock and Boyd Terry) – Two fellow superheroes in The Aquabats' metropolis who briefly appear in the season one finale "Showtime!". While neither of the duo's powers are fully explained, Chainsaw appears in a lumberjack-themed outfit with a chainsaw attached to his hand, while Catboy sports a pair of fuzzy cat ears and a furry tail. The two seem to have a contentious history with The Aquabats, almost coming to blows with each other during an argument over which superhero team should take on an impending alien invasion, though this is also not elaborated upon. Pollock was a member of The Aquabats from 1995 to 2006 while Terry co-founded the band's original line-up in 1994; both men used the stage names Chainsaw and Catboy during their tenure with the band.
 SuperMagic PowerMan! (played by "Weird Al" Yankovic) and Lanolin Lady! (played by Stephanie Allynne) – The most popular and competent superhero team in the city, SuperMagic PowerMan! and Lanolin Lady! are a husband-and-wife duo who both possess such superpowers as flight, super strength and the ability to shoot lasers with the aide of a "magic headband". Reportedly, they have saved the world many times, and as a result, have sold more merchandise than The Aquabats.
 The Shark Fighter (played by Rhys Darby) – A wavy-haired, knife-wielding ocean vigilante, the Shark Fighter is, as his name would imply, a man skilled in the art of fighting sharks, a mission he assumed after his lover was eaten by one many years prior. In the episode "The Shark Fighter!", he teams up with The Aquabats to help defeat a roving gang of vicious land sharks, briefly taking Crash McLarson under his wing as his protégé. The character of the Shark Fighter is based and modeled upon The Aquabats' song of the same name from their 2011 album Hi-Five Soup! and thus has several traits borrowed directly from its lyrics, such as his method of transportation in "[riding] an otter like a motorcycle".

Animated
 The Gnarbarians – A tribe of friendly barbarian warriors who inhabit the alien planet The Aquabats crash-land upon in the episode "CobraMan!". They are ruled by the King Gnarbarian (voiced by James R. Briggs, Jr.) and Queen Gnarbarian (voiced by Christian Jacobs). The Gnarbarians' name is a portmanteau of "gnarly" and "barbarians".
 The Professor – Introduced in flashback by the MC Bat Commander in the episode "Summer Camp!", The Professor is a kindly mad scientist who discovered The Aquabats washed ashore on a beach after they fled from their tropical island of Aquabania, giving them vague "chemicals" and instruments to help them become the world's first superhero rock and roll band. The Professor and his backstory are directly taken from The Aquabats' original band mythology, wherein the character was referred to as Professor Monty Corndog and played in the band's stage shows by musician Parker Jacobs. As all of the origin flashbacks in season two intentionally contradict each other, it is yet unknown if The Professor is officially canon, a product of the Commander's imagination and/or merely a tongue-in-cheek homage to the early years of The Aquabats' career.

Unknown
 The Fox Man (played by Super Show! visual effects supervisor Joel Fox) – The Fox Man is a humanoid fox creature - or possibly a grown man in a cheap fox costume - who briefly appears at least once in the background of every episode of the series. Despite sometimes appearing in close proximity to The Aquabats, he never interacts with nor is acknowledged by any of the series' characters apart from the episode "Summer Camp!", where he is shot at by MC Bat Commander while hunting for a different mythical creature. Apart from being an Easter egg for fans of the show, the Fox Man is never explained within the context of the series.

References

External links
 Official website
 
 Official website of The Aquabats

Characters
Cultural depictions of American people